Blue Light or Blue light may refer to:

Science and technology
 A portion of the visible spectrum
 Cherenkov radiation, the physical phenomenon responsible for the characteristic blue glow in nuclear reactors
 Blue light (pyrotechnic signal), a firework composition used for night-time signaling and illumination
 Biological effects of high-energy visible light

Military and emergency services
 Blue Light (counter-terrorist subunit), a 1970s US counter-terrorist subunit of the 5th Special Forces Group   
 Blue lights, also known as blues and twos services, British emergency services
 Blue lights, emergency telephone systems meant to deter crime, specially designed for use on campuses

Arts, entertainment and media

Film and television
 The Blue Light (1932 film), a 1932 film directed by Leni Riefenstahl
 The Blue Light (2003 film), a 2003 Japanese film directed by Yukio Ninagawa
 Blue Light (TV series), a 1966 television series starring Robert Goulet

Literature
 Blue Light (novel), 1998 novel by Walter Mosley
 Blue Light, an alternative title to The Transall Saga, a novel by Gary Paulsen
 "The Blue Light" (fairytale), a Brothers Grimm fairy tale

Music

Albums and EPs
 Blue Light, an EP by Aoife O'Donovan released in 2010
 Blue Lights (album), an album by Kenny Burrell released as two volumes in 1958

Songs
 "Blue Light", a song by Armageddon Dildos from their 1997 album Speed
 "Blue Light", a song by Bloc Party from their 2005 album Silent Alarm
 "Blue Light", a song by David Gilmour from his 1984 album About Face
 "Blue Light", a song by Mazzy Star from their 1993 album So Tonight That I Might See
 "Blue Light", a song by Miranda Sex Garden from their 1992 EP Iris
 "Blue Light", a song by Mitski from her 2018 album Be the Cowboy
 "Blue Light", a song by Mostly Autumn from their 2006 album Heart Full of Sky
 "Blue Light", a song by Prince from the Love Symbol Album
 "Blue Light", a song from Braggin' in Brass: The Immortal 1938 Year
 "Blue Lights" (song), a song by Jorja Smith from her 2018 album Lost & Found
 "The Blue Light", a song by Frank Zappa from his 1981 album Tinsel Town Rebellion

Other uses
 Blue Light (horse) (born 1958), Canadian racehorse
 Blue Light, a Canadian beer made by the Labatt Brewing Company
 Blue Light Specials, sales held at Kmart stores
 Bluelight (web forum), a web forum dedicated to discussing controlled drugs

See also
 Blue Lights in the Basement, a studio album by American singer Roberta Flack released in 1977
 Blue light phototherapy, light therapy involving a medical device that radiates blue light
 Cobalt blue light, a type of light used by slit lamps to help in the diagnosis of eye diseases
 Effects of blue light technology
 Blue Lanterns (disambiguation)
 Bluelight (disambiguation)